Pope Joan (Ioannes Anglicus, 855–857) was, according to legend, a woman who reigned as pope for two years  during the Middle Ages. Her story first appeared in chronicles in the 13th century and subsequently spread throughout Europe. The story was widely believed for centuries, but most modern scholars regard it as fictional.

Most versions of her story describe her as a talented and learned woman who disguised herself as a man, often at the behest of a lover. In the most common accounts, owing to her abilities she rose through the church hierarchy and was eventually elected pope. Her sex was revealed when she gave birth during a procession and she died shortly after, either through murder or of natural causes. The accounts state that later church processions avoided this spot and that the Vatican removed the female pope from its official lists and crafted a ritual to ensure that future popes were male. In the 16th century, Siena Cathedral featured a bust of Joan among other pontiffs; this was removed after protests in 1600.

Jean de Mailly's chronicle, written around 1250, contains the first mention of an unnamed female pope and inspired several more accounts over the next several years. The most popular and influential version is that interpolated into Martin of Opava's Chronicon Pontificum et Imperatorum later in the 13th century. Martin introduced details that the female pope's birth name was John Anglicus of Mainz, that she reigned in the 9th century and that she entered the church to follow her lover. The existence of Pope Joan was used in the defence of Walter Brut in his trial of 1391. The legend was generally accepted as true until the 16th century, when a widespread debate among Catholic and Protestant writers called the story into question: various writers noted the implausibly long gap between Joan's supposed lifetime and her first appearance in texts. Protestant scholar David Blondel ultimately demonstrated the impossibility of the story. Pope Joan is now widely considered fictional, though the legend remains influential in cultural depictions.

Legends
The earliest mention of a female pope appears in the Dominican Jean de Mailly's chronicle of Metz, Chronica Universalis Mettensis, written in the early 13th century. In his telling the female pope is not named and the events are set in 1099. According to Jean:

Jean de Mailly's story was picked up by his fellow Dominican Stephen of Bourbon, who adapted it for his work on the Seven Gifts of the Holy Ghost. However the legend gained its greatest prominence when it appeared in the third recension (edited revision) of Martin of Opava's Chronicon Pontificum et Imperatorum later in the 13th century. This version, which may have been by Martin himself, is the first to attach a name to the figure, indicating that she was known as John Anglicus or John of Mainz. It also changes the date from the 11th to the 9th century, indicating that Joan reigned between Leo IV and Benedict III in the 850s. According to the Chronicon:

One version of the Chronicon gives an alternative fate for the female pope: she did not die immediately after her exposure but was confined and deposed, after which she did many years of penance. Her son from the affair eventually became Bishop of Ostia and ordered her entombment in his cathedral when she died.

Other references to the female pope are attributed to earlier writers, though none appears in manuscripts that predate the Chronica. The one most commonly cited is Anastasius Bibliothecarius (d. 886), a compiler of Liber Pontificalis, who was a contemporary of the female Pope by the Chronicon'''s dating. However the story is found in only one unreliable manuscript of Anastasius. This manuscript, in the Vatican Library, bears the relevant passage inserted as a footnote at the bottom of a page. It is out of sequence and in a different hand, one that dates from after the time of Martin of Opava. This ‘witness’ to the female pope is likely to be based on Martin's account and not a possible source for it. The same is true of Marianus Scotus's Chronicle of the Popes, a text written in the 11th century. Some of its manuscripts contain a brief mention of a female pope named Johanna (the earliest source to attach to her the female form of the name), but all these manuscripts are later than Martin's work. Earlier manuscripts do not contain the legend.

Some versions of the legend suggest that subsequent popes were subjected to an examination whereby, having sat on a so-called sedia stercoraria or ‘dung chair’ containing a hole, a cardinal had to reach up and establish that the new pope had testicles before announcing "Duos habet et bene pendentes" ("He has two and they dangle nicely"), or "habet" ("he has them") for short.

There were associated legends as well. In the 1290s the Dominican Robert of Uzès recounted a vision in which he saw the seat "where, it is said, the pope is proved to be a man". Pope Joan has been associated with marvelous happenings. Petrarch (1304–1374) wrote in his Chronica de le Vite de Pontefici et Imperadori Romani that after Pope Joan had been revealed as a woman:

However the attribution of this work to Petrarch may be incorrect.

Later development

From the mid-13th century onward the legend was widely disseminated and believed. Joan was used as an exemplum in Dominican preaching. Bartolomeo Platina, the scholar who was prefect of the Vatican Library, wrote his Vitæ Pontificum Platinæ historici liber de vita Christi ac omnium pontificum qui hactenus ducenti fuere et XX in 1479 at the behest of his patron, Pope Sixtus IV. The book contains the following account of the female Pope:

Pope John VIII: John, of English extraction, was born at Mentz (Mainz) and is said to have arrived at popedom by evil art; for disguising herself like a man, whereas she was a woman, she went when young with her paramour, a learned man, to Athens, and made such progress in learning under the professors there that, coming to Rome, she met with few that could equal, much less go beyond her, even in the knowledge of the scriptures; and by her learned and ingenious readings and disputations, she acquired so great respect and authority that upon the death of Pope Leo IV (as Martin says) by common consent she was chosen pope in his room. As she was going to the Lateran Church between the Colossean Theatre (so called from Nero's Colossus) and St. Clement's her travail came upon her, and she died upon the place, having sat two years, one month, and four days, and was buried there without any pomp. This story is vulgarly told, but by very uncertain and obscure authors, and therefore I have related it barely and in short, lest I should seem obstinate and pertinacious if I had admitted what is so generally talked. I had better mistake with the rest of the world, though it be certain, that what I have related may be thought not altogether incredible.

References to the female Pope abound in the later Middle Ages and Renaissance. Jans der Enikel (1270s) was the first to tell the story in German. Giovanni Boccaccio wrote about her in De Mulieribus Claris (1353). The Chronicon of Adam of Usk (1404) gives her a name, Agnes, and furthermore mentions a statue in Rome that is said to be of her. This statue had never been mentioned by any earlier writer anywhere; presumably it was an actual statue that came to be taken to be of the female pope. A late-14th-century edition of the Mirabilia Urbis Romae, a guidebook for pilgrims to Rome, tells readers that the female Pope's remains are buried at St. Peter's. It was around this time that a long series of busts of past Popes was made for the Duomo of Siena, which included one of the female pope, named as "Johannes VIII, Foemina de Anglia" and included between Leo IV and Benedict III.

At his trial in 1415 Jan Hus argued that the Church did not necessarily need a pope because, during the pontificate of "Pope Agnes" (as he also called her), it got on quite well. Hus's opponents at the trial insisted that his argument proved no such thing about the independence of the Church but they did not dispute that there had been a female pope at all.

During the Reformation
In 1587 Florimond de Raemond, a magistrate in the parlement de Bordeaux and an antiquary, published his first attempt to deconstruct the legend, Erreur Populaire de la Papesse Jeanne (also subsequently published under the title L'Anti-Papesse). The tract applied humanist techniques of textual criticism to the Pope Joan legend, with the broader intent of supplying sound historical principles to ecclesiastical history, and the legend began to come apart, detail by detail. Raemond's Erreur Populaire went through successive editions, reaching a fifteenth as late as 1691.

In 1601, Pope Clement VIII declared the legend of the female pope to be untrue. The famous bust of her, inscribed Johannes VIII, Femina ex Anglia, which had been carved for the series of papal figures in the Duomo di Siena about 1400 and was noted by travelers, was either destroyed or recarved and relabeled, replaced by a male figure, that of Pope Zachary.

The legend of Pope Joan was "effectively demolished" by David Blondel, a mid-17th-century Protestant historian, who suggested that Pope Joan's tale may have originated in a satire against Pope John XI, who died in his early 20s. Blondel, through detailed analysis of the claims and suggested timings, argued that no such events could have happened.

The 16th-century Italian historian Onofrio Panvinio, commenting on one of Bartolomeo Platina's works that refer to Pope Joan, theorized that the story of Pope Joan may have originated from tales of Pope John XII; John reportedly had many mistresses, including one called Joan, who was very influential in Rome during his pontificate.

At the time of the Reformation, various Protestant writers took up the Pope Joan legend in their anti-Catholic writings, and the Catholics responded with their own polemic.  According to Pierre Gustave Brunet, Various authors, in the 16th and 17th centuries, occupied themselves with Pope Joan, but it was from the point of view of the polemic engaged in between the partisans of Lutheran or Calvinist reform and the apologists of Catholicism.
An English writer, Alexander Cooke, wrote a book entitled Pope Joane: A Dialogue between a Protestant and a Papist, which purported to prove the existence of Pope Joan by reference to Catholic traditions. It was republished in 1675 as A Present for a Papist: Or the Life and Death of Pope Joan, Plainly Proving Out of the Printed Copies, and Manscriptes of Popish Writers and Others, That a Woman called Joan, Was Really Pope of Rome, and Was There Deliver'd of a Bastard Son in the Open Street as She Went in Solemn Procession. The book gives an account of Pope Joan giving birth to a son in plain view of all those around, accompanied by a detailed engraving showing a rather surprised looking baby peeking out from under the Pope's robes. Even in the 19th century, authors such as Ewaldus Kist and Karl Hase discussed the story as a real occurrence. However, other Protestant writers, such as David Blondel and Gottfried Leibniz, rejected the story.

Modern analysis and critique

Most modern scholars dismiss Pope Joan as a medieval legend. British historian John Julius Norwich dismissed the myth with a logical assessment of evidence. The Oxford Dictionary of Popes declares that there is "no contemporary evidence for a female Pope at any of the dates suggested for her reign", but nonetheless acknowledges that Pope Joan's legend was widely believed for centuries, even by Catholics.

The 1910 Catholic Encyclopedia elaborated on the historical timeline problem:

Between Leo IV and Benedict III, where Martinus Polonus places her, she cannot be inserted, because Leo IV died 17 July 855, and immediately after his death Benedict III was elected by the clergy and people of Rome; but, owing to the setting up of an Antipope, in the person of the deposed Cardinal Anastasius, he was not consecrated until 29 September. Coins exist which bear both the image of Benedict III and of Emperor Lothair, who died 28 September 855; therefore Benedict must have been recognized as pope before the last-mentioned date. On 7 October 855, Benedict III issued a charter for the Abbey of Corvey. Hincmar, Archbishop of Reims, informed Nicholas I that a messenger whom he had sent to Leo IV learned on his way of the death of this Pope, and therefore handed his petition to Benedict III, who decided it (Hincmar, ep. xl in P.L., CXXXVI, 85). All these witnesses prove the correctness of the dates given in the lives of Leo IV and Benedict III, and there was no interregnum between these two Popes, so that at this place there is no room for the alleged Popess.

It has also been noted that enemies of the papacy in the 9th century make no mention of a female pope. For example, Photios I of Constantinople, who became Patriarch in 858 and was deposed by Pope Nicholas I in 863, was an enemy of the pope. He vehemently asserted his own authority as patriarch over that of the pope in Rome, and would have made the most of any scandal of that time regarding the papacy; but he never mentions the story once in any of his voluminous writings. Indeed, at one point he mentions "Leo and Benedict, successively great priests of the Roman Church".

Rosemary and Darroll Pardoe, authors of The Female Pope: The Mystery of Pope Joan, theorize that if a female pope did exist, a more plausible time frame is 1086 and 1108, when there were several antipopes; during this time the reign of the legitimate popes Victor III, Urban II, and Paschal II was not always established in Rome, since the city was occupied by Henry IV, Holy Roman Emperor, and later sacked by the Normans. This also agrees with the earliest known version of the legend, by Jean de Mailly, as he places the story in the year 1099. De Mailly's account was acknowledged by his companion Stephen of Bourbon.

Peter Stanford, a British writer and former editor of The Catholic Herald, concluded in The Legend of Pope Joan: In Search of the Truth (2000) "Weighing all th[e] evidence, I am convinced that Pope Joan was an historical figure, though perhaps not all the details about her that have been passed on down the centuries are true".  Stanford's work has been criticised as "credulous" by one mainstream historian, Vincent DiMarco.
Against the lack of historical evidence to her existence, the question remains as to why the Pope Joan story has been popular and widely believed. Philip Jenkins in The New Anti-Catholicism: The Last Acceptable Prejudice suggests that the periodic revival of what he calls this "anti-papal legend" has more to do with feminist and anti-Catholic wishful thinking than historical accuracy.

The sedes stercoraria, the throne with a hole in the seat, now at St. John Lateran (the formal residence of the popes and center of Catholicism), is to be considered. This and other toilet-like chairs were used in the consecration of Pope Pascal II in 1099. In fact, one is still in the Vatican Museums, another at the Musée du Louvre. The reason for the configuration of the chair is disputed. It has been speculated that they originally were Roman bidets or imperial birthing stools, which because of their age and imperial links were used in ceremonies by Popes intent on highlighting their own imperial claims (as they did also with their Latin title, Pontifex Maximus).

Alain Boureau quotes the humanist Jacopo d'Angelo de Scarparia, who visited Rome in 1406 for the enthronement of Gregory XII. The pope sat briefly on two "pierced chairs" at the Lateran: "... the vulgar tell the insane fable that he is touched to verify that he is indeed a man", a sign that this corollary of the Pope Joan legend was still current in the Roman street.

Medieval popes, from the 13th century onward, did indeed avoid the direct route between the Lateran and St Peter's, as Martin of Opava claimed. However, there is no evidence that this practice dated back any earlier. The origin of the practice is uncertain, but it is quite likely that it was maintained because of widespread belief in the Joan legend, and it was thought genuinely to date back to that period.

Although some medieval writers referred to the female pope as "John VIII", a genuine Pope John VIII reigned between 872 and 882. Due to the Dark Ages' lack of records, confusion often reigns in the evaluation of events. The Pope Joan legend is also conflated with the gap in the numbering of the Johns. In the 11th century, Pope John XIV was mistakenly counted as two popes. When Petrus Hispanus was elected pope in 1276, he believed that there had already been twenty popes named John, so he skipped the number XX and numbered himself John XXI.

In 2018, Michael E. Habicht, an archaeologist at Flinders University, published new evidence in support of an historical Pope Joan. Habicht and grapho-analyst Marguerite Spycher analyzed papal monograms on medieval coins and found that there were two significantly different monograms attributed to Pope John VIII. Habicht argues that the earlier monogram, which he dates from 856 to 858, belongs to Pope Joan, while the latter monogram, which he dates to after 875, belongs to Pope John VIII.

In fiction
Pope Joan has remained a popular subject for fictional works. Plays include Ludwig Achim von Arnim's Päpstin Johanna (1813), a fragment by Bertolt Brecht (in Werke Bd 10) and a monodrama, Pausin Johanna, by Cees van der Pluijm (1996).

The Greek author Emmanuel Rhoides' 1866 novel, The Papess Joanne, was admired by Mark Twain and Alfred Jarry and freely translated by Lawrence Durrell as The Curious History of Pope Joan (1954). The American Donna Woolfolk Cross's 1996 historical romance, Pope Joan, was recently made into a German musical as well as the movie described below. Other novels include Wilhelm Smets' Das Mährchen von der Päpstin Johanna auf’s Neue erörtert (1829), Marjorie Bowen's Black Magic (1909), Ludwig Gorm's Päpstin Johanna (1912),  Yves Bichet's La Papesse Jeanne (2005) and Hugo N. Gerstl's Scribe: The Story of the Only Female Pope (2005). Howard Pyle's The Merry Adventures of Robin Hood contains a reference.

There have been two films based on the story of Pope Joan: Pope Joan (1972), directed by Michael Anderson, was entitled The Devil's Imposter in the US. In 2009 it was recut to include more of John Briley's original script and released as She... who would be Pope. Also in 2009, another film with the title Pope Joan was released, this one a German, British, Italian and Spanish production directed by Sönke Wortmann and produced by Bernd Eichinger, based on Cross's novel.

The 1982 play Top Girls by Caryl Churchill featured Pope Joan as a character, who was invited to a restaurant along with other historically important women in the past by a modern-day woman, Marlene, to discuss the restriction of feminism in the past.

In the 2016 video game Persona 5, Pope Joan is referenced as the inspiration for Johanna, one of Makoto Niijima's titular personas (cognitive beings used by humans to battle demons).

In July 2019 a theatrical show was held in Malta at Mdina ditch featuring Pope Joan as the main character.

See also
 Legends surrounding the papacy
 Marozia
 Saeculum obscurum Theodora (senatrix)
 The High Priestess

References

Further reading

Primary sources
 Jean de Mailly Chronica Universalis Mettensis (1254)
 Martin of Opava Chronicon pontificum et imperatorum (1278)

Secondary sources
 
 Clement Wood, The Woman Who Was Pope, Wm. Faro, Inc., New York. 1931
 Arturo Ortega Blake, Joanna Kobieta która zostala Papiezem, Edit. Philip Wilson, 2006. Published in Warszawa, .
 Alain Boureau, The Myth of Pope Joan, University Of Chicago Press, 2000. Published in Paris as La Papesse Jeanne. The standard account among historians, .
 Stephen L. Harris, Bryon L. Grigsby, Misconceptions about the Middle Ages, Routledge, 2007. .
 Peter Stanford, The She-Pope. A Quest for the truth behind the Mystery of Pope Joan, Heineman, London 1998  . Published in the US as The Legend of Pope Joan: In Search of the Truth, Henry Holt & Company, 1999. A popularized journalistic account.
 "Top 5 Myths About the Papacy"
 Joan Morris, Pope John VIII, an English Woman, Alias Pope Joan Vrai Publishers, London 1985 .
 Michael E. Habicht,Päpstin Johanna. Ein vertuschtes Pontifikat einer Frau oder eine fiktive Legende? epubli, Berlin 2018 .
 Michael E. Habicht,Pope Joan: The covered-up pontificate of a woman or a fictional legend? epubli, Berlin 2018 .Legends of a Medieval Female Pope May Tell the Truth
 Alcuin Blamires, ed., Woman Defamed and Woman Defended, Oxford: Clarendon Press, 1992.

Fiction
 Donna Woolfolk Cross, Pope Joan: A Novel Three Rivers Press, 2009.
 Lawrence Durrell, The Curious History of Pope Joan''. London: Derek Verschoyle, 1954. Freely translated from the Greek Papissa Joanna, 1886, by Emmanuel Rhoides.
 Emmanuel Rhoides, Papissa Joanna translated by T. D. Kriton, Govostis, Athens, 1935.

External links

 
 ABC Prime time Looking for Pope Joan
 "Pope Joan" by Dennis Barton gives timeline esp. of stories appearance in written histories.
 Golden Age of Female Trannies in Medieval Europe
 Mystery Files: Pope Joan 2012, Episode 10. Smithsonian Channel.  Retrieved February 17, 2014.
 

 
Fictional characters introduced in the 13th century
Christian folklore
Fictional cross-dressers
Legendary popes
Medieval legends
Women and the papacy
Nonexistent people